Lonchorhynchinae  is a subfamily of temnospondyl amphibians within the family Trematosauridae.

Classification
Below is a cladogram from Steyer (2002) showing the phylogenetic relationships of trematosaurids:

References

External links
Mikko’s Phylogeny Archive

Triassic temnospondyls
 
Triassic first appearances